is an East Japan Railway Company (JR East) railway station located in the town of Shizukuishi, Iwate Prefecture, Japan.

History
Harukiba Station opened on September 10, 1964. The station was absorbed into the JR East network upon the privatization of the JNR on April 1, 1987.

Lines
Harukiba Station is served by the Tazawako Line, and is located 18.7 km from the terminus of the line at Morioka Station.

Station layout
Harukiba Station has a single side platform serving a single bi-directional track. There is no station building, but only a weather shelter on the platform itself. The station is unattended.

Surrounding area

  National Route 46
Omyojin Post Office

See also
 List of Railway Stations in Japan

External links

  

Railway stations in Iwate Prefecture
Shizukuishi, Iwate
Tazawako Line
Railway stations in Japan opened in 1964
Stations of East Japan Railway Company